The 2021 US Open was the 141st edition of tennis' US Open and the fourth and final Grand Slam event of the year. It was held on outdoor hard courts at the USTA Billie Jean King National Tennis Center in Flushing Meadows, New York City.

Daniil Medvedev won the men's singles title. Emma Raducanu won the women's singles title, becoming the first qualifier, male or female, to reach a major final and win a major title.

Dominic Thiem and Naomi Osaka were the men's and women's singles defending champions. However, Thiem withdrew from the tournament due to a wrist injury causing him to end his season early. Osaka lost in the third round to Leylah Fernandez.

Both Dylan Alcott and Diede de Groot achieved the Golden Slam in wheelchair quad singles and wheelchair women's singles, respectively, by winning all four majors and the Paralympics in 2021. Alfie Hewett and Gordon Reid also achieved the Grand Slam in wheelchair men's doubles by winning all four majors in 2021. Novak Djokovic was attempting to be the first man to complete a calendar Grand Slam in men's singles since Rod Laver in 1969, having won the men's singles tournaments at the 2021 Australian Open, French Open and Wimbledon, but unlike Alcott and de Groot, who also won the Olympic medal (Djokovic lost to Alexander Zverev in the semifinal for the gold medal match at the Olympics in 2021), he lost to Medvedev in the final.

This was the first Major tournament since the 1997 Australian Open not to feature Roger Federer, Rafael Nadal, Serena Williams, or Venus Williams in the main singles draw.

The United States Tennis Association allowed the return of spectators after the 2020 tournament was held behind closed doors due to the COVID-19 pandemic in New York. Due to a surge in COVID-19 cases resulting from the delta variant of the virus, spectators had to present a negative COVID-19 test or proof of vaccination in order to be allowed to enter the grounds.

Tournament
The 2021 US Open was the 141st edition of the tournament and took place at the USTA Billie Jean King National Tennis Center in Flushing Meadows–Corona Park of Queens in New York City, United States.

The tournament was an event run by the International Tennis Federation (ITF) and part of the 2021 ATP Tour and the 2021 WTA Tour calendars under the Grand Slam category. The tournament consisted of both men's and women's singles and doubles draws, as both doubles draws returned to the standard 64 players, and singles players remained in standard 128-person format in each category. There were also singles and doubles events for both boys and girls (players under 18).

The tournament was played on hard courts and took place over a series of 17 courts with Laykold surface, including the three existing main showcourts – Arthur Ashe Stadium, Louis Armstrong Stadium and Grandstand.

Wheelchair events were held on September 9 as scheduled. Unlike previous events on scheduling conflicts with the tournament and the Summer Paralympic Games, the 2020 Summer Paralympics (which was delayed from 2020 due to the pandemic) were held during the first week of the tournament.

Singles players 
Men's singles

Women's singles

Events

Men's singles

  Daniil Medvedev def.  Novak Djokovic, 6–4, 6–4, 6–4

Women's singles

  Emma Raducanu def.  Leylah Fernandez, 6–4, 6–3

Men's doubles

  Rajeev Ram /  Joe Salisbury def.  Jamie Murray /  Bruno Soares, 3–6, 6–2, 6–2

Women's doubles

  Samantha Stosur /  Zhang Shuai def.  Coco Gauff /  Caty McNally, 6–3, 3–6, 6–3

Mixed doubles

  Desirae Krawczyk /  Joe Salisbury def.  Giuliana Olmos /  Marcelo Arévalo, 7–5, 6–2

Wheelchair men's singles

  Shingo Kunieda def.  Alfie Hewett, 6–1, 6–4

Wheelchair women's singles

  Diede de Groot def.  Yui Kamiji, 6–3, 6–2

Wheelchair quad singles

  Dylan Alcott def.  Niels Vink, 7–5, 6–2

Wheelchair men's doubles

  Alfie Hewett /  Gordon Reid def.  Gustavo Fernández /  Shingo Kunieda, 6–2, 6–1

Wheelchair women's doubles

  Diede de Groot /  Aniek van Koot def.  Yui Kamiji /  Jordanne Whiley, 6–1, 6–2

Wheelchair quad doubles

  Sam Schröder /  Niels Vink def.  Dylan Alcott /  Heath Davidson, 6–3, 6–2

Boys' singles

  Daniel Rincón def.  Shang Juncheng, 6–2, 7–6(8–6)

Girls' singles

  Robin Montgomery def.  Kristina Dmitruk, 6–2, 6–4

Boys' doubles

  Max Westphal /  Coleman Wong def.  Viacheslav Bielinskyi /  Petr Nesterov, 6–3, 5–7, [10–1]

Girls' doubles

  Ashlyn Krueger /  Robin Montgomery def.  Reese Brantmeier /  Elvina Kalieva, 5–7, 6–3, [10–4]

Point and prize money distribution

Point distribution
Below is a series of tables for each of the competitions showing the ranking points on offer for each event.

Senior

Wheelchair

Junior

Prize money 
The US Open has the richest prize purse of all Grand Slams. The total prize money compensation for the 2021 US Open is $57.5 million.

References

External links

 

 
2021